John Bassett (1915–1998) was a Canadian publisher and media baron.

John Bassett or Basset may also refer to:
Sir John Basset (1462–1528), courtier in the reign of Henry VIII
John Bassett (by 1503–50/51) of Uley in Gloucestershire, Member of Parliament (MP) for Midhurst
John Basset (1518–1541), servant to Thomas Cromwell, Lord Privy Seal; son of John IV
John Bassett (died 1551), of Llantrithyd, Wales, MP for Old Sarum
John Basset (writer) (1791–1843), writer on Cornish mining
John D. Bassett (1866–1965), American industrialist
John Spencer Bassett (1867–1928), American academic and minority rights proponent
Johnnie Bassett (1935–2012), American electric blues guitarist and singer
Johnny Bassett (born 1935), jazz musician credited with putting Beyond the Fringe together
John F. Bassett (1939–1986), Canadian pro football owner

See also
Basset family, English gentry
John Bassett Moore (1860–1947), American lawyer
John Bassett Theatre, Toronto
John Bassette (1941–2006), American folk singer and songwriter